11 May is the official holiday of the city of Miskolc, Hungary. The city's council proclaimed this day as a holiday in 1992 and it was first celebrated in 1993. It is the anniversary of the granting of the coat of arms of Miskolc in 1909 by King Franz Joseph.

By tradition several awards are awarded on this day in the National Theatre of Miskolc. Many of these awards are named after famous citizens.

The awards

Sources

Culture in Miskolc